Concetta Mason (born 1952) is an American glass artist. 

Her work is included in the collections of the Seattle Art Museum, the Cooper Hewitt, Smithsonian Design Museum the Hunter Museum of American Art, and the Metropolitan Museum of Art.

References

External links
 images of Mason's work on Invaluable

1952 births
20th-century American women artists
21st-century American women artists
American glass artists
Living people